Allan MacKenzie (1931 – 2012), Canadian air force general

Allan MacKenzie may refer to:

Alan MacKenzie (born 1966), retired Scottish footballer
Alan MacKenzie (ice hockey) (born 1952), retired Canadian ice hockey defenceman
Al MacKenzie, a fictional Marvel Comics character

See also
Alan McKenzie
Allen McKenzie